John Pardon Taber (June 28, 1868 – February 21, 1940) was an American pitcher in Major League Baseball who played two games for the Boston Beaneaters in 1890.

External links

1868 births
1940 deaths
19th-century baseball players
Major League Baseball pitchers
Boston Beaneaters players
Brockton (minor league baseball) players
Worcester (minor league baseball) players
Baseball players from Massachusetts
People from Acushnet, Massachusetts